Enyo boisduvali is a moth of the  family Sphingidae. It is known from Cuba.

It is similar to Enyo lugubris lugubris, but can be distinguished by the well-developed, strongly dentate postmedian lines on the undersides of both wings. Furthermore, the centre of the thorax is paler grey than the tegulae and it contains a dark brown or black median inverted Y-shaped mark. The postmedian area of the forewing upperside is dark with orange highlights. There are three well-developed transverse postmedian lines on both the forewing and hindwing underside.

There are probably two to three generations per year.

References

Enyo (moth)
Moths described in 1904
Endemic fauna of Cuba